The 1931 Army Cadets football team represented the United States Military Academy in the 1931 college football season. In their second season under head coach Ralph Sasse, the Cadets compiled an 8–2–1 record, shut out four of their eleven opponents, and outscored all opponents by a combined total of 296 to 72.  In the annual Army–Navy Game, the Cadets defeated the Midshipmen  The Cadets also defeated Notre Dame, 12 to 0. Army's two losses were to Harvard by a point and a  shutout at 

Right End Richard Brinsley Sheridan, Jr. broke his neck making a tackle in the tie with Yale and died two days later of his injuries.

Two Army players were recognized on the All-America team. Tackle Jack Price received first-team honors from the International News Service (INS) and Central Press Association (CP), and halfback Ray Stecker received third-team honors from the INS.

Schedule

References

Army
Army Black Knights football seasons
Army Cadets football